Seven fires prophecy is an Anishinaabe prophecy that marks phases, or epochs, in the life of the people on Turtle Island, the original name given by the indigenous peoples of the now North American continent. The seven fires of the prophecy represent key spiritual teachings for North America, and suggest that the different colors and traditions of the human beings can come together on a basis of respect. It contains information for the future lives of the Anishinaabe which are still in the process of being fulfilled.

In 1988, Edward Benton-Banai documented the prophecy in The Mishomis Book.

Overview
Originally, the prophecy and the Ojibwa migration story were closely linked. However, the last half of the prophecy appears to apply to all peoples in contact with the Anishinaabeg. Consequently, with the growth of the Pan-Indian Movement in the 1960s and the 1970s, concepts of the Seven fires prophecy merged with other similar prophetical teaching found among Indigenous peoples of North America forming a unified environmental, political, and socio-economic voice towards Canada and the United States. The Seven fires prophecy was originally taught among the practitioners of Midewiwin.

William Commanda, an Algonquin elder and former chief of the Kitigàn-zìbì Anishinàbeg First Nation, was the  wampum belt keeper for the seven fires prophecy. He died on August 3, 2011.

Seven fires 

Originally, the prophecies were given by eight prophets in seven different time periods. According to oral tradition, the Mi'kmaq Nation heard the first Prophet.  The remaining seven prophets appeared before and were recorded by the Anishinaabeg. A prophecy of each of these seven periods were then called a "fire". The teachings of the Seven fires prophecy also state that when the world has been befouled and the waters turned bitter by disrespect, human beings will have two options to choose from, materialism or spirituality. If they chose spirituality, they will survive, but if they chose materialism, it will be the end of it.

First 

In heeding this prophecy, the Anishinaabe peoples, after receiving guarantees of the safety of their "Fathers" (the Abenaki peoples) and their "allied brothers" (Mi'kmaq) of having the Anishinaabeg move inland, away from the Atlantic coast, mass migration of the Anishinaabeg took place, proceeding to the "First Stopping Place" known as Mooniyaang, known today as Montreal, Quebec. There, the Nation found a "turtle-shaped island" marked by miigis (cowrie) shells.

The Nation grew to a large number and spread up both Ottawa River and the St. Lawrence River. The second of the "turtle-shaped island" marked by miigis shells was at Niagara Falls.

Second 

The oral traditions of the members of Council of Three Fires say that the realization of the Second fire came about the "Third Stopping Place" located somewhere near what now is Detroit, Michigan. The Anishinaabeg had divided between those who went up Ottawa River and those that went up the St. Lawrence River. After leaving the area about Niagara Falls, this group proceeded to the "Round Lake" (Lake St. Clair) and found the third "turtle-shaped island" marked by miigis shells. They continued westward until arriving along the southern shores of Lake Michigan but by this time, the evidence of the miigis shells were lost, and the southern Anishinaabeg became "lost" both physically in their journey as well as spiritually in their journey. The southern group of Anishinaabeg disintegrated into what today are the Ojibwa, Odawa and the Potawatomi. The northern group along the Ottawa River divided into Algonquin, Nipissing and the Mississaugas, but they maintained cohesion that was not maintained by the southern group.

Eventually, a Potawatomi girl had a dream and pointed the southern group back towards and past the "Round Lake". The southern group rejoined not as a single Anishinaabe peoplehood but rather as a unified alliance called Council of Three Fires. Travelling east and north, and then west, the Council crossed a series of small islands known as "the stepping stones" until they arrived onto Manitoulin island, described as the "Fourth Stopping Place" of the "turtle-shaped island" marked by miigis shell. There on the island, the Council met up with the Mississaugas, who then spiritually fully re-aligned the formerly lost southern group with the northern group who were never lost. The Odawa facilitated the "healing" and the island became synonymous as the "Odawa's Island" in the Anishinaabe language.

Third 

From the cultural center on Manitoulin Island, the Ojibwe moved to the area about Sault Ste. Marie, where there was the next "turtle-shaped island" marked by miigis shell. Baawating or "The Rapids" of the Saint Marys River became the "Fifth Stopping Place" of the Ojibwe. From this spot, the Ojibwe and the rapids became synonymous with each other, with the Ojibwe known by the Dakota peoples as Iyo-ḣaḣatoŋwaŋ ("cascading-waterfalls people") and later by the French as Saulteurs ("cascaders") and Saulteaux ("cascades"). From here, the Ojibwe moved west, dividing into two groups, each travelling along the shores of Lake Superior, searching for the "land where food grows upon the waters".

Fourth 

The Fourth fire prophecy was delivered by a pair of prophets. The first prophet said,

The other prophet said,

While at the "Fifth Stopping Place", the light-skinned people in big wooden boats, known as the French arrived. Consequently, the French were called Wemitigoozhii ("wooden-boat people"). Though the French Crown was interested in colonialism, as far as the Anishinaabeg were concerned, the French appeared only interested in commerce and trade through mercantilism. Together with the French, the Anishinaabeg formed trade alliances, which not only extended French colonial powers into the heart of North America, but strengthened the political and military might of the Anishinaabeg.

After the French came the Zhaaganaash ("Off-shore ones") of Great Britain. But out of the Zhaaganaash came the Gichi-mookomaan ("Big-knives")—the Virginians (i.e. Americans).

Fifth

Sixth

Seventh 

The Seventh Prophet that came to the people long ago was said to be different from the other prophets. This prophet was described as "young and had a strange light in his eyes" and said:

Notes

References
 Benton-Banai, Edward, The Mishomis Book - The Voice of the Ojibway (St. Paul: Red School House Publishers, 1988).
 Buffalohead, Roger and Priscilla Buffalohead, Against the Tide of American History: The Story of Mille Lacs Anishinabe. Minnesota Chippewa Tribe (Cass Lake, MN: 1985).
 Warren, William W. (1851), History of the Ojibway People.
 McFadden, Steven (1991), Profiles in Wisdom: Native Elders Speak About the Earth, Harlem Writers Guild Press.
 Christmas, Kevin (2011), "Aboriginal Consultation", MAWQATMUTI’KW, Winter/Spring Issue.
 Robin Wall Kimmerer (2013), "Braiding Sweetgrass - Indigenous Wisdom, Scientific Knowledge, and the Teachings of Plants", www.milkweed.org.

External links 

Anishinaabe mythology
Native American culture
Native American religion
Prophecy